The 2022–23 season is Al-Shorta's 49th season in the Iraqi Premier League, having featured in all 48 previous editions of the competition. Al-Shorta are participating in the Iraqi Premier League as defending champions, as well as the Iraq FA Cup and the Arab Club Champions Cup.

Al-Shorta began the season by winning the 2022 Iraqi Super Cup, beating Al-Karkh 1–0.

Squad
Numbers in parenthesis denote appearances as substitute.

Personnel

Technical staff

Management

Kit
Supplier: Qithara (club's own brand)

Transfers

In

Out

Competitions

Iraqi Super Cup

Iraqi Premier League

Iraq FA Cup

References

External links
Al-Shorta SC Official Website

Al-Shorta SC seasons